Kjetil Trædal Thorsen is a Norwegian architect. In 1987, he co-founded the architecture firm Snøhetta.

History 
Kjetil Trædal Thorsen was born 14 June 1958 on the Norwegian coastal island of Karmøy. After several years in Germany and England, he studied architecture in Graz, Austria. He had practiced at the office of Espen Tharaldsen (Arbeidsgruppen Hus) in Bergen (1982–1983), Ralph Erskine in Stockholm (1983–1984) and David Sandved in Haugesund (1985). In 1987 he formed an architectural practice in Oslo with a group of young architects. They named it Snøhetta after the tallest mountain in the Dovrefjell National Park.

Designs
Thorsen led several award winning design competitions for public buildings around the world.  He led the Snøhetta teams designing the museum built for the Winter Olympics in Lillehammer, Norway, the 2007 Serpentine Gallery temporary Pavilion in London designed with Olafur Eliasson, the new Bibliotheca Alexandrina library in Alexandria, Egypt, and the new Oslo Opera House in Oslo, Norway. He was a founder of Norway’s foremost architecture gallery, Galleri Rom in 1986.

Associations
Thorsen is a member of the Norwegian Architectural Association (NAL) and has served on their design competition committee. He has served as a juror on various design competitions in Europe.

Since 2004, Kjetil Trædal Thorsen has been a professor at the Institute for Experimental Studies in Architecture of the University of Innsbruck.

Decorations and honorary degrees
2008 Commander of the Royal Norwegian Order of St Olav
2010 Global Award for Sustainable Architecture
2011 Honorary doctor (dr.h.c.) of Norwegian University of Science and Technology (NTNU) 
2013 Prince Eugen Medal for architecture

References

Sources

External links

Snøhetta official website
Interview with Kjetil Thorsen

1958 births
Living people
Architects from Oslo
Recipients of the Prince Eugen Medal
Academic staff of the University of Innsbruck